Information-Based Indicia (IBI) refers to a secure postage evidencing standard used by the United States Postal Service (USPS) to indicate electronic postage payment.

Information-Based Indicia is a 2-dimensional PDF417 or data matrix barcode combined with human-readable information.  The barcode data contains such information as amount of postage, origin zip code, destination, mail class, weight, confirmation/tracking numbers, and a cryptographic signature.  The human-readable information shows at a minimum the information required by the USPS Domestic Mail Manual (DMM).

References

External links 
 Advanced Secure Postage Evidencing: the Information Based Indicia USPS
 POM Revision: Information-Based Indicia Postage Paid Labels Update USPS

United States Postal Service